‘Ali Maḥmūd Ṭāhā (‎) (1901–1949) was an Egyptian romantic poet. He has been called several nicknames, such as: The Engineer and The Lost Sailor.  The Egyptian literary scholar, 'Abd al-Majid 'Abidin, published an Arabic study discussing 'Ali Mahmud Taha "al-Munhandis" (the Engineer Ali Mahmud Taha) and Iliya Abu Madi in 1967, describing them both as reformist poets (sha'irayn mujaddidayn).

Nevertheless, Taha was not as immersed in romanticism as Ibrahim Nagi and Mohammad al-Hamshari.

Furthermore, Taha's poets were politically-colored, but even provocative and patriotic, despite his death, which was before the 23rd-of-July Revolution. He was among the contributors of Al Siyasa, newspaper of the Liberal Constitutional Party.

Early life 

Taha was born to a family of the middle-class in Mansoura, in Delta, Egypt.

Poems 

East and West
Spirits and Ghosts
Flower and Wine
Passion Returned
Nights of the Lost Sailor
The Lost Sailor
Birth of a Poet
Palestine

References

External links 
Ali Taha on Egyptian State Information Service
Poems of Ali Taha (Arabic)

Egyptian male poets
1901 births
1949 deaths
People from Mansoura, Egypt
20th-century Egyptian poets
20th-century male writers